Tachybaptus is a genus of small members of the grebe family birds. The genus name means "quick diving": it is from Ancient Greek takhys "quick" and bapto "I dip". It has representatives over much of the world, including the tropics.

These grebes breed in small colonies in heavily vegetated areas of freshwater lakes. They may move to more open or coastal waters when not breeding, and birds in those areas where the waters freeze may be migratory. Like all grebes, they nest on the water's edge, since the legs are set very far back and they cannot walk well. The striped young are sometimes carried on the adult's back. These small grebes are excellent swimmers and divers, and pursue their fish prey underwater.

The sexes are similar: dumpy and short-billed with a “powder puff” rear end. Adults have a distinctive breeding plumage and loud breeding calls. In winter, they are grey and white.

The five Old World species are closely related to each and at least three have interbred. Unlike these, the least grebe lacks chestnut colouring on the neck, and has formerly been placed in at least three other genera.

Species

References

 Olgilvie and Rose, Grebes of the World 
 Harrison, Peter Seabirds: An Identification Guide 

 
Podicipedidae
Bird genera
Taxa named by Ludwig Reichenbach